"Higher" is a song by British electronic music group Clean Bandit, featuring vocals from Puerto Rican-American rapper, singer, and songwriter Iann Dior. It was released as a single on 29 January 2021 by Atlantic and Warner Music. The song was written by Dan Smith, Jack Patterson and Mark Ralph.

Music video
A music video to accompany the release of "Higher" was first released onto YouTube on 29 January 2021. A man sings while he dances in a tropical island.

Personnel
Credits adapted from Tidal.
 Grace Chatto – producer, steel drums
 Jack Patterson – producer, composer, keyboards, programmer
 Mark Ralph – producer, additional keyboards, mixer, percussion, programmer
 Dan Smith – composer, additional vocals
 Michael Olomo – composer
 Mike Hough – additional vocals
 Yasmin Green – additional vocals
 Gemma Chester – assistant engineer
 Luke Patterson – drums
 Josh Green – engineer
 Iann Dior – featured artist
 Stuart Hawkes – masterer
 Ryan Cantu – recording engineer

Charts

Weekly charts

Year-end charts

Release history

References

2021 songs
2021 singles
Clean Bandit songs
Gracey (singer) songs
Iann Dior songs
Song recordings produced by Mark Ralph (record producer)
Songs written by Dan Smith (singer)
Songs written by Iann Dior
Songs written by Jack Patterson (Clean Bandit)